Gloeocystis is a genus of green algae in the family Radiococcaceae.

References

Sphaeropleales genera
Sphaeropleales